The 1920 United States presidential election in South Dakota took place on November 2, 1920 as part of the 1920 United States presidential election in which all contemporary forty-eight states participated. Voters chose five electors, or representatives to the Electoral College, who voted for president and vice president.

The 1918 mid-term elections had seen the Midwestern farming community largely desert the Democratic Party due to supposed preferential treatment of Southern farmers: Democratic seats in the Midwest fell from thirty-four to seventeen, whilst Scandinavian-Americans were also vigorously opposed to entering the war. Moreover, Democratic fear of Communism seen in the Palmer Raids and "Red Scare" led to Cox, then Governor of Ohio, to ban German-language instruction in public schools in 1919. Much more critical for German-Americans was the view that outgoing President Woodrow Wilson was deliberately trying to punish Germany and Austria for starting the war, especially via his disregard for the United Kingdom's continuing blockade of Germany. Stressing Harding's German ancestry, the German press drummed up the view that "a vote for Harding is a vote against the persecutions suffered by German-Americans during the war." 

As the campaign began after the Republican Party had nominated U.S. Senator Warren G. Harding of Ohio and the Democratic Party former Ohio governor James M. Cox, a further blow to the Democrats occurred when the national economy suffered a major downturn following the wartime boom, resulting in plummeting agricultural prices that were especially problematic in the Midwest. Whereas Cox travelled throughout the nation apart from the "Solid South" during September, Harding, despite having four times the budget, campaigned from his home in Marion, Ohio. A poll by the giant Rexall drug store chain – which in 1916 had been accurate enough to predict Wilson's razor-thin wins in New Hampshire and California – suggested Harding would win 382 electoral votes, and at the end of October, although no more opinion polls had been published, most observers were even more convinced that the Republicans would take complete control of all branches of government.

Vote
The late-October predictions of a complete takeover of the federal government by the Republican Party were entirely born out. So unpopular was Wilson that – although South Dakota was the only Plains state Wilson had lost in 1916 – Cox lost over half the Wilson vote from that election, and lost every county. In fact, Non Partisan League candidate Parley Parker Christensen finished second ahead of Cox in twenty-nine counties and was only 1,231 votes behind the Democratic candidate in South Dakota as a whole. Aided by German Lutheran hostility towards Prohibition, Christensen gained over 41 percent in Hutchinson County, and over thirty percent in three other East River counties.

Results

Results by county

See also
 United States presidential elections in South Dakota

Notes

References

South Dakota
1920
1920 South Dakota elections